This is a list of episodes for the anime television series Kekkaishi. The series was adapted by Sunrise from the manga Kekkaishi by Yellow Tanabe. It was directed by Kenji Kodama with character designs by Hirotoshi Takaya and music by Taku Iwasaki. The opening theme for all episodes is "Sha la la -Ayakashi NIGHT-" by Saeka Uura.

It was broadcast for 52 episodes in Japan between 16 October 2006 and 12 February 2008 on Nippon Television, Yomiuri TV, and Nippon Television Network System, in the "golden" timeslot of 7 p.m. Monday. During its initial broadcast, episodes were frequently among the top ten rated anime television shows, sometimes as the only original (non-sequel) show to do so. It was later rebroadcast in Taiwan on Taiwan Television, in Malaysia on Animax Asia also (Japanese Dub with English Subtitles) 8TV and NTV7, in Hong Kong on Cable TV Hong Kong, in Philippines on Hero TV (Tagalog dubbed) and on its Competitor Animax Asia (Japanese Audio), and on GMA Network, and in Indonesia on antv, and in India on Animax India. The anime has been licensed in North America by Viz Media, which began broadcasting episodes online through Hulu.com in January 2010. The English dub of the series started airing in the United States on Adult Swim on May 30, 2010, finishing its first run on May 29, 2011. All episodes were broadcast at 12:30 a.m. ET/PT.

Episodes

See also
 List of Kekkaishi chapters
 List of Kekkaishi characters

References

External links
 Sunrise official anime website 
 Yumiuri TV Japan official anime site 
 Animax India official website for Kekkaishi 
 
 Animax Philippines/Malaysia Official Webpage for Kekkaishi

Kekkaishi